Josiah Hardy (1715–1790) was a British merchant and colonial administrator who served as colonial Governor of New Jersey between 1761 and 1763. He was succeeded in the post by William Franklin, the son of Benjamin Franklin. Hardy was later appointed as consul at Cádiz.

Early life and education
Hardy came from a naval family. His father was Vice-Admiral Sir Charles Hardy, and one of his brothers, Charles Hardy, became an admiral.

Career
He became a merchant, emphasizing trade between Great Britain and the North American colonies. In 1761, he was appointed as Governor of New Jersey, serving until 1763. He was succeeded by William Franklin, the son of Benjamin Franklin, who were both born in the colony of Pennsylvania.

Marriage and family
Hardy married Harriet, daughter of Sir Thomas D'Aeth, and they had five daughters: Harriet, Elizabeth Sophia, Priscilla, Louisa and Charlotte.

Their fourth daughter, Louisa (1757–1853), married the naval officer Lieutenant John Cooke on 15 June 1790 at St Leonard's, Shoreditch. They had a single daughter together, born on 26 January 1797 at Stoke Damerel. Cooke was killed while commanding  at the Battle of Trafalgar on 21 October 1805.

Notes

References
 Skemp, Sheila L. William Franklin: Son of a Patriot, Servant of a King. Oxford University Press, 1990.

British merchants
Colonial governors of New Jersey
1715 births
1790 deaths